This is a list of the largest daily changes in the Nasdaq Composite from 1971.

Largest percentage changes

Largest point changes

Largest intraday point swings 
This table shows the largest intraday point swings since 1985.

Largest intraday percentage changes

Largest intraday percentage turnovers

Largest daily percentage changes per year 

 Year has not yet ended.

See also 
NASDAQ Composite
Closing milestones of the Nasdaq Composite
List of largest daily changes in the Dow Jones Industrial Average
List of largest daily changes in the S&P 500 Index
List of largest daily changes in the Russell 2000
List of stock market crashes

References

External links 
 http://online.wsj.com/mdc/public/page/2_3047-nasdaq_alltime.html
 https://finance.yahoo.com/q/hp?s=%5EIXIC+Historical+Prices

Nasdaq
Economy-related lists of superlatives